Qeshlaq-e Bakhshali (also Romanized as Qeshlāq-e Bakhsh‘alī; also known as Bakhsh‘alī) is a village in Angut-e Sharqi Rural District, Anguti District, Germi County, Ardabil Province, Iran. At the 2006 census, its population was 33, in 6 families.

References 

Towns and villages in Germi County